The Cheonho Bridge crosses the Han River in South Korea and connects the districts of Gangdong-gu and Gwangjin-gu. The bridge was completed on July 5, 1976. The bridge was built to relieve the heavy traffic on the Gwangjin Bridge, but by 1986 the bridge was experiencing much traffic itself. This was resolved by building the Olympic Bridge in 1988.

References

Bridges in Seoul
Bridges completed in 1976
Bridges over the Han River (Korea)
1976 establishments in South Korea
20th-century architecture in South Korea